Jeff Winans (October 12, 1951 – December 21, 2012) was an American football guard. He played for the Buffalo Bills in 1973 and 1975, the New Orleans Saints in 1976 and for the Tampa Bay Buccaneers from 1977 to 1978.

He died of mixed drug intoxication and cardiomyopathy on December 21, 2012, in Turlock, California at age 61.

References

1951 births
2012 deaths
American football offensive guards
USC Trojans football players
Buffalo Bills players
New Orleans Saints players
Tampa Bay Buccaneers players